A Thermal Protective Aid (TPA) is an aluminized polyethylene suit with heat sealed seams that protects from the elements and prevents hypothermia.

It is defined by the International Life-Saving Appliance (LSA) Code as follows:

Every survival craft should have 2 thermal protective aid suits or 10% of its total carrying capacity whichever is greater. For the purpose of high visibility in all weather conditions the suit is coloured in international orange.

Some manufacturers currently construct suits with discrete size bands (XS–XXL) and others of a single ‘universal’ size. Due to its usage conditions it should be suitable to be worn over bulky clothing  and lifejacket.

References

See also  
 Immersion suit
 Space blanket

Safety clothing